The Snake Prince is an Indian fairy tale, a Punjabi story collected by Major Campbell in Feroshepore.  Andrew Lang included it in The Olive Fairy Book (1907).

Synopsis

A poor old woman, with nothing to eat, heads for the river to fish and to bathe.  When she comes out of the river, she finds a venomous snake in her pot. She takes it home, so that it bites her and end her misery.  But once she opens the pot, she finds a rich necklace, which she sells to the king, who puts it in a chest. Soon after, when he opens it to show the queen, he instead finds a baby boy, whom the king and his wife raise as their son, and the old woman becomes his nurse. She speaks of how that boy came about.

The king agrees with a neighboring king that their children should marry. But when the other king's daughter goes to marry, her mother warns her to ask about the magic. The princess refuses to speak until the son tells her that he was a prince from far off, who had been turned into a snake, and then he became a snake again. The princess mourns for the prince where he had vanished, and the snake comes to her, telling if she puts bowls of milk and sugar in the four corners of the room, many snakes will come, led by their Queen. If she stands in the Queen's way, she can ask for her husband; but if she's frightened and does not do her bidding, she cannot have him back.

The princess does as he said, and wins back her husband.

Analysis

Tale type
The tale is classified in the Aarne-Thompson-Uther Index as type ATU 425A, "The Search for the Lost Husband". These tales refer to a human maiden married to an animal husband that, in actuality, is a human prince under a magical disguise. He disappears and she has to gain him back.

Related tales
Scholarship also points that a story of a maiden marrying a snake being is attested in the Panchatantra, an Indian collection of folkloric accounts and related tales.

Motifs
According to Stith Thompson and  study of motifs of Indian literature and oral folklore, the tale contains the motif D432 "Transformation: mineral form to person" (in this case, a jewel necklace).

See also
 The Ruby Prince (Punjabi folktale)
Princess Himal and Nagaray, Kashmiri folktale
Tulisa, the Wood-Cutter's Daughter
Champavati (Assamese folktale)
 The Enchanted Snake, Italian literary tale

References

Indian fairy tales
Fictional princes
Fictional snakes
Fiction about shapeshifting
Animal tales
Male characters in fairy tales
Indian folklore
Indian literature
ATU 400-459